Konavle is a municipality and a small region located southeast of Dubrovnik, Croatia.

It is administratively part of the Dubrovnik-Neretva County and the center of the municipality is Cavtat.

Demographics
The total municipality population was 8,577 people in 2011, split in the following 32 settlements:

 Brotnice, population 31
 Cavtat, population 2,153
 Čilipi, population 933
 Drvenik, population 52
 Duba Konavoska, population 63
 Dubravka, population 295
 Dunave, population 155
 Đurinići, population 96
 Gabrili, population 210
 Gruda, population 741
 Jasenice, population 14
 Komaji, population 275
 Kuna Konavoska, population 17
 Lovorno, population 183
 Ljuta, population 194
 Mihanići, population 96
 Mikulići, population 88
 Močići, population 447
 Molunat, population 212
 Palje Brdo, population 130
 Pločice, population 83
 Poljice, population 70
 Popovići, population 236
 Pridvorje, population 236
 Radovčići, population 228
 Stravča, population 60
 Šilješki, population 22
 Uskoplje, population 136
 Vitaljina, population 211
 Vodovađa, population 190
 Zastolje, population 150
 Zvekovica, population 570

In the 2011 census, 97.1% of the population were Croats. Historically, inhabitants of Konavle were called Canalesi.

History
In 1427, the authorities of Dubrovnik set out to eradicate Bogomilism in Konavle. Catholicism was restored there by the Franciscans in a rapid process that converted the entire population.
Though considerably damaged during the Croatian War of Independence, Konavle maintains its status as one of the wealthiest municipalities in all of Croatia, consistently ranking amongst the ten richest.

Geography
Konavle is actually a narrow field located between the Sniježnica mountain and the Adriatic Sea, spanning the area from the coastal town of Cavtat to the Montenegrin border at Prevlaka. Other than Cavtat, only the southernmost village of Molunat is located on the coast, while the other 30 villages are in the hinterland.

The Sniježnica peak at 1234 meters of altitude is the highest point of the Dubrovnik-Neretva County and village of Kuna with its 700 m altitude is the highest village in the county. Although Gruda is the administrative center of the municipality, the largest settlement is Cavtat.

A few kilometres from Cavtat there is "Pasjača", the 2020 most beautiful beach in Europe, hidden below the Konavle cliffs.

Transport
The airport for Dubrovnik is located near the Konavle village of Čilipi.

Notable people from Konavle
Tereza Kesovija, singer
Vlaho Bukovac, painter
Frano Supilo, politician
Baltazar Bogišić, jurist & legal historian
Ivan Gundulić, poet, Konavle Count.
Anton Perich, artist, filmmaker, poet

References

External links
 Molunat - The most southern tourist destination in Croatia

Populated places in Dubrovnik-Neretva County
Municipalities of Croatia
Konavle